{{DISPLAYTITLE:C6H14O2}}
The molecular formula C6H14O2 (molar mass: 118.17 g/mol, exact mass: 118.0994 u) may refer to:

 2-Butoxyethanol
 1,1-Diethoxyethane
 1,6-Hexanediol
 2-Methyl-2,4-pentanediol (MPD)
 Pinacol